Eight was released in 2000 and is the eighth studio album by British rock band New Model Army. Following the departure of Robert Heaton, Michael Dean and Dean White were recruited into the band, who also co-produced Eight with Justin Sullivan.

Singles
Two tracks were released as  singles:  "You Weren't There" (November 1999) and "Orange Tree Roads" (2000).

Track listing
All tracks written by Justin Sullivan except where otherwise noted.
"Flying Through the Smoke" (Sullivan, Robert Heaton) – 3:13
"You Weren't There" – 3:36
"Orange Tree Roads" – 3:56
"Someone Like Jesus" – 6:36
"Stranger – 3:35
"R&R" (Sullivan, Michael Dean) – 3:37
"Snelsmore Wood" – 4:14
"Paekakariki Beach" – 4:43
"Leeds Road 3AM" (Sullivan, Dean) – 5:18
"Mixam" (Sullivan, Dean) – 3:31
"Wipe Out" – 4:12

Personnel

Production
Justin Sullivan – producer, recorded by
Michael Dean – producer, recorded by
Dean White – producer, recorded by

Musicians
Justin Sullivan – vocals, guitar, keyboards, bass, harmonica on "You Weren't There"
Nelson – bass, percussion
Michael Dean – drums, percussion, backing vocals
Dean White – keyboards, guitar, bass
Dave Blomberg – guitar
Mark Feltham – harmonica on "Someone Like Jesus" and "Mixam"
Louise Jones – voice on "Orange Tree Roads"

References

discogs.com
allmusic
The Official NMA Website

New Model Army (band) albums
2000 albums